Chen Dongjie (born 18 April 1970) is a Chinese sport shooter who competed in the 1996 Summer Olympics.

References

1970 births
Living people
Chinese male sport shooters
Skeet shooters
Olympic shooters of China
Shooters at the 1996 Summer Olympics
Shooters at the 1998 Asian Games
Asian Games medalists in shooting
Place of birth missing (living people)
Asian Games silver medalists for China
Medalists at the 1998 Asian Games
People from Xuchang
Sport shooters from Henan
20th-century Chinese people